The 1978–79 San Antonio Spurs season was the Spurs' third season in the NBA and 12th season as a franchise.

Draft picks

Roster

Regular season

Season standings

z - clinched division title
y - clinched division title
x - clinched playoff spot

Record vs. opponents

Playoffs

|- align="center" bgcolor="#ccffcc"
| 1
| April 15
| Philadelphia
| W 119–106
| Larry Kenon (30)
| Billy Paultz (9)
| Silas, Bristow (7)
| HemisFair Arena10,253
| 1–0
|- align="center" bgcolor="#ccffcc"
| 2
| April 17
| Philadelphia
| W 121–120
| George Gervin (29)
| Larry Kenon (7)
| Silas, Gale (8)
| HemisFair Arena16,709
| 2–0
|- align="center" bgcolor="#ffcccc"
| 3
| April 20
| @ Philadelphia
| L 115–123
| James Silas (32)
| Larry Kenon (15)
| Kenon, Gervin (5)
| Spectrum14,039
| 2–1
|- align="center" bgcolor="#ccffcc"
| 4
| April 22
| @ Philadelphia
| W 115–112
| George Gervin (32)
| Larry Kenon (9)
| Larry Kenon (6)
| Spectrum11,163
| 3–1
|- align="center" bgcolor="#ffcccc"
| 5
| April 26
| Philadelphia
| L 97–120
| James Silas (19)
| Larry Kenon (9)
| Silas, Gale (5)
| HemisFair Arena16,055
| 3–2
|- align="center" bgcolor="#ffcccc"
| 6
| April 29
| @ Philadelphia
| L 90–92
| James Silas (27)
| Larry Kenon (15)
| Mike Gale (6)
| Spectrum18,276
| 3–3
|- align="center" bgcolor="#ccffcc"
| 7
| May 2
| Philadelphia
| W 111–108
| George Gervin (33)
| George Gervin (12)
| Mark Olberding (7)
| HemisFair Arena16,055
| 4–3
|-

|- align="center" bgcolor="#ccffcc"
| 1
| May 4
| @ Washington
| W 118–97
| George Gervin (34)
| Larry Kenon (21)
| James Silas (4)
| Capital Centre19,035
| 1–0
|- align="center" bgcolor="#ffcccc"
| 2
| May 6
| @ Washington
| L 95–115
| Larry Kenon (25)
| Larry Kenon (8)
| Olberding, Dietrick (3)
| Capital Centre19,035
| 1–1
|- align="center" bgcolor="#ccffcc"
| 3
| May 9
| Washington
| W 116–114
| George Gervin (29)
| Billy Paultz (12)
| Kenon, Gale (5)
| HemisFair Arena15,318
| 2–1
|- align="center" bgcolor="#ccffcc"
| 4
| May 11
| Washington
| W 118–102
| George Gervin (42)
| Larry Kenon (17)
| Silas, Gale (6)
| HemisFair Arena16,055
| 3–1
|- align="center" bgcolor="#ffcccc"
| 5
| May 13
| @ Washington
| W 103–107
| George Gervin (28)
| Mark Olberding (13)
| James Silas (6)
| Capital Centre19,035
| 3–2
|- align="center" bgcolor="#ffcccc"
| 6
| May 16
| Washington
| L 100–108
| George Gervin (20)
| Larry Kenon (15)
| James Silas (7)
| HemisFair Arena16,055
| 3–3
|- align="center" bgcolor="#ffcccc"
| 7
| May 18
| @ Washington
| L 105–107
| George Gervin (42)
| Larry Kenon (11)
| James Silas (5)
| Capital Centre19,035
| 3–4
|-

Awards and records
George Gervin, All-NBA First Team

References

San Antonio Spurs seasons
San Antonio
San Antonio
San Antonio